Yarki is a rural locality (a selo) and the administrative center of Yarkovskoye Rural Settlement, Novokhopyorsky District, Voronezh Oblast, Russia. The population was 1,058 as of 2010. There are 12 streets.

Geography 
Yarki is located 53 km northwest of Novokhopyorsk (the district's administrative centre) by road. Podgornoye is the nearest rural locality.

References 

Populated places in Novokhopyorsky District